Dual specificity protein phosphatase 15 is an enzyme that in humans is encoded by the DUSP15 gene.

The protein encoded by this gene belongs to the non-receptor class of the protein-tyrosine phosphatase family. The encoded protein has both protein-tyrosine phosphatase activity and serine/threonine-specific phosphatase activity, and therefore is known as a dual specificity phosphatase. Three transcript variants, encoding two different isoforms have been found for this gene.

References

Further reading

External links 
 PDBe-KB provides an overview of all the structure information available in the PDB for Human Dual specificity protein phosphatase 15

EC 3.1.3